This is a list of games on the Wii video game console that use WiiConnect24.  WiiConnect24 games are distinguished from Wii Wi-Fi Connection games in that WiiConnect24 support only allows for passive connection between players, such as the sharing of credits in Metroid Prime 3: Corruption or Metroid Prime: Trilogy. Some games support both active connectivity with the Nintendo Wi-Fi Connection (requiring an independent 12-digit Friend Code), as well as passive connectivity with WiiConnect24 (only needing the Wii's own 16-digit Friend Code), such as Mario Kart Wii.

After Nintendo's termination of the WiiConnect24 service on June 28, 2013, the following game titles remain virtually playable, but their online connectivity and functionality that requires use of WiiConnect24 are rendered defunct after the ending of the WiiConnect24 service.

Released games

Wii

WiiWare

See also
 List of Wii games
 List of WiiWare games
 List of Wii Wi-Fi Connection games

References

Wii